Jang Myong-Il (born April 25, 1986) is a North Korean footballer who plays as a defender for the Wolmido Sports Club.

He played on the Amrokkang team that won the 2008 DPRK championship.

References 

Living people
1986 births
North Korean footballers
North Korea international footballers
Association football defenders
Association football midfielders
Wolmido Sports Club players